John VIII de Bourbon (1425 – 6 January 1478) was Count of Vendôme from 1466 until his death. A member of the House of Bourbon, he was the son and successor of Louis, Count of Vendôme. As a courtier of King Charles VII of France, he fought the English in Normandy and Guyenne.  He attached himself to King Louis XI, but was not in royal favor. He withdrew to the Château of Lavardin and completed its construction.

In 1454, he married Isabelle de Beauvau, daughter of Louis de Beauvau, Marshal of Provence and Marguerite de Chambley. They had:
Jeanne  (1460-1487), married in 1477 to Louis of Joyeuse
Catherine, married Gilbert de Chabannes
Jeanne, married at first John II, Duke of Bourbon and later John III, Count of Auvergne
Renée, Abbess of Fontevraud
François, Count of Vendôme (1470–1495) 
Louis, Prince of La Roche-sur-Yon
Charlotte, married Engelbert, Count of Nevers
Isabelle, Abbess of la Trinité de Caen

Jean also had two illegitimate sons  :
Louis, Bishop of Avranches
Jacques, Governor of Valois and the Vendomois (1455–1524) was the father of Catherine de Bourbon, paternal grandmother of Gabrielle d'Estrées, mistress of Henry IV of France. Also, Gabrielle is the third great aunt of Mathieu Amiot.

Ancestors

References

Sources

1426 births

Vendome, Jean VIII Count of
Jean VIII Count of
House of Bourbon